Mikhalis Louka (born 23 February 1970) is a retired Cypriot shot putter. His brother Ilias Louka was also a shot putter.

He won the silver medal at the 1998 Commonwealth Games. He also competed at the 1996 Olympic Games and the 1999 World Championships without reaching the final. He became visiting Greek shot put champion in 1990 and 1999, and Greek indoor champion in 2001.

His personal best throw was 19.70 metres, achieved in April 1996 in Nicosia. This is the Cypriot record.

References

1970 births
Living people
Cypriot male shot putters
Olympic athletes of Cyprus
Athletes (track and field) at the 1996 Summer Olympics
Commonwealth Games silver medallists for Cyprus
Commonwealth Games medallists in athletics
Athletes (track and field) at the 1990 Commonwealth Games
Athletes (track and field) at the 1994 Commonwealth Games
Athletes (track and field) at the 1998 Commonwealth Games
World Athletics Championships athletes for Cyprus
Athletes (track and field) at the 1991 Mediterranean Games
Athletes (track and field) at the 1993 Mediterranean Games
Greek Cypriot people
Mediterranean Games competitors for Cyprus
Medallists at the 1998 Commonwealth Games